The Somali Warlord Alliance, officially called the Alliance for the Restoration of Peace and Counter-Terrorism (abbreviated ARPCT) was a Somali alliance created by various Somali warlords and businessmen to challenge the emerging influence of the Islamic Courts Union during the Somali Civil War.

The Warlord Alliance included Botan Ise Alin, Mohammed Dheere, Mohamed Qanyare, Musa Sudi Yalahow, Nuur Daqle, Abdi Hasan Awale Qeybdiid, Omar Muhamoud Finnish and others. Some of them were ministers in the Transitional Federal Government (TFG) of Somalia.

The International Crisis Group, which had direct contacts with the warlords, said in June 2006 that the CIA was funnelling $100,000 to $150,000 a month to the ARPCT.

The Warlord Alliance were involved in the 2006 Battle of Mogadishu.

Abdi Hasan Awale Qeybdiid defected from the alliance in June 2006, saying that "Since the formation of ARPCT, Mogadishu has been a centre of a military crisis that has led to the needless death of hundreds of people, therefore I decide to quit the alliance to build on the gains of the Islamic tribunals and give peace a chance,".

Africa News described the Alliance as disappearing when their regions were over-run by the Islamic Courts Union in 2006.

Controversies
Michael Zorick (the U.S. State Department's political officer for Somalia), who had been stationed in Nairobi, was reassigned to Chad after he sent a cable to Washington criticizing Washington's policy of paying Somali warlords. The New York Times stated, "The American activities in Somalia have been approved by top officials in Washington and were reaffirmed during a National Security Council meeting about Somalia in March."

On 7 June 2006, the Republic of the Congo's president and current African Union head, Denis Sassou-Nguesso, criticized the United States for its involvement in fighting in Mogadishu following his meeting with President George W. Bush and Secretary of State Condoleezza Rice.

References 

Factions in the Somali Civil War
2006 in Somalia